Karlo Kešinović (born 12 December 1989) is a Croatian footballer, who currently plays for Mladost Buzin.

Club career
In 2013, Kešinović signed for Austrian third division side SV Neuberg after playing for NK Hrvatski Dragovoljac in the Croatian top flight,.

In 2016, he signed for Maltese club St. Andrews, before joining NK Krka in the Slovenian second division. After an unsuccessful trial with DPMM, Brunei's most successful team, he played for Gibraltar outfit Mons Calpe SC as well as NK Sloga Koprivnički Ivanec in the Croatian lower leagues.

References

External links
 Karlo Kešinović at Soccerway

1989 births
Living people
People from Brčko District
Association football defenders
Croatian footballers
NK Hrvatski Dragovoljac players
NK Rudeš players
St. Andrews F.C. players
NK Krka players
Croatian Football League players
First Football League (Croatia) players
Austrian Regionalliga players
Maltese Premier League players
Slovenian Second League players
Gibraltar Premier Division players
Croatian expatriate footballers
Expatriate footballers in Austria
Croatian expatriate sportspeople in Austria
Expatriate footballers in Malta
Croatian expatriate sportspeople in Malta
Expatriate footballers in Slovenia
Croatian expatriate sportspeople in Slovenia
Expatriate footballers in Gibraltar
Croatian expatriate sportspeople in Gibraltar